Mehmed Kemâl Bey (March 1, 1884 – April 10, 1919) was an Ottoman administrative officer and teacher. He was later court-martialed and executed for his role in the Armenian genocide. According to one witness, Kemal had "made a vow on the honor of the Prophet: I shall not leave a single Armenian alive in the sanjak of Yozgat."

Early life and education 
Kemâl was born on March 1, 1884, in Beirut to a family originating in Larissa (Thessaly). He was educated in Antalya and Izmir where he studied at the modern-day Ankara University.

Career 
In 1909, he concluded his studies and became a kaymakam (provincial governor). In the 1915, he became the governor of Boğazlıyan province. He opposed the occupation of Istanbul and refused to obey Mehmed VI's orders.

Trial and execution 
In 1919, Bey was tried for war crimes by a military court at the Istanbul trials and sentenced to death. During the trial, he maintained that he was innocent and followed the orders he was given. On April 10, 1919, Bey was publicly hanged in Bayazit Square in Istanbul. His last words before his execution was ''They hang me to befriend foreign states. If that's what they call justice, damn that justice.''

Aftermath 
On October 10, 1922, Kemal was declared a "National Martyr" (Ottoman Turkish şehid-i millî, Turkish Millî Şehit) by the Grand National Assembly. In 1926, the Turkish State gifted his family two properties confiscated during the Armenian deportations. In 1973 his grave was renovated and Kemâl was given the title of "Martyr of the Nation". His grave was declared a memorial.

References 

1884 births
1919 deaths
20th-century executions
Armenian genocide perpetrators
People executed by the Ottoman Empire by hanging
Civil servants from the Ottoman Empire

People convicted by the Ottoman Special Military Tribunal
People executed for war crimes
Executed mass murderers
Kaymakams